Sir David James Scott Cooksey  (born 14 May 1940) is a British businessman, venture capitalist and policy advisor.

Education
Cooksey was educated at Westminster School and St Edmund Hall, Oxford, where he gained a degree in metallurgy. He was made an Honorary Fellow in 1995.

Career

Cooksey embarked on a career as an industrial engineer, rising through the management of the company Formica International, and finally leading the management buy-out of a subsidiary in 1971.

In 1981, he formed Advent Venture Partners, one of the first venture capital firms in the United Kingdom, which provided financing for technology-based businesses. He remained chairman until September 2006. He was the first chairman of the British Venture Capital Association (1983/4) and chairman of the European Private Equity and Venture Capital Association (2005/6).

Cooksey was chairman of the Audit Commission from 1986 to 1995, and in 1996, as chairman of the Local Government Commission for England, proposed the introduction of unitary authorities in many areas of England. 

In 2003, Cooksey was appointed to chair the Biosciences Industry Growth Taskforce by HM Treasury and the DTI and issued the report "Biosciences 2015" that year. 

He revised and reissued the report in 2009. In 2006, he published the Cooksey Review of UK health research for HM Treasury which led to a new funding structure and approach to medical research in the UK. It also paved the way to new approaches to pharmaceutical licensing.

Sir David was a director of the Bank of England from 1994 until 2005, including a period as Chairman of Directors from 2001. He was a Governor of the Wellcome Trust from 1995 to 1999, and was Chairman of the Board of Directors at Diamond Light Source Ltd from its formation in 2002 until September 2008. 

He was chairman of the Francis Crick Institute from 2009 to August 2017. He was Pro Chancellor of the University of Southampton from 2009-2013.

Sir David was Chairman of London and Continental Railways from 2006 to 2011. He was appointed chairman of Bechtel Ltd in 2008.  He chaired UK Financial Investments Limited from 2009 to 2012.

Awards and honours
He was knighted in 1993. He was appointed a Knight Grand Cross of the Order of the British Empire (GBE) in the Queen's Birthday Honours 2007 for public service.
He has received Honorary Degrees from University College London, University of Southampton and Kingston University and he has Honorary Fellowships at The Academy of Medical Sciences, University of Wales, Cardiff University, Imperial College London, King's College London and the British Science Association.
He was elected Honorary Fellow of the Royal Society of London in 2020.

Personal life
In May 1973, Cooksey married Janet Wardell-Yerburgh, known as Poppy, the widow of the Olympic oarsman Hugh Wardell-Yerburgh, who had one small daughter from her first marriage. They had a daughter and a son, born in 1974 and 1976, and lived at Brooklands, Swanwick, Hampshire, and Aston House, Lower Mall, Hammersmith. They were divorced in 2003. Cooksey married Mary Ann Lutyens, widow of Richard Lutyens, in January 2011

Cooksey is a keen sailor and a member of the Royal Yacht Squadron.

References

Our Board of Directors, Diamond Light Source Ltd
The Private Equity Awards Hall of Fame
Sir David Cooksey: The yacht can wait until the £1.3bn health research spend is shipshape The Independent, 23 April 2006
Curriculum Vitae, European Private Equity and Venture Capital Association
 , BBC News

1940 births
Living people
British businesspeople
Businesspeople awarded knighthoods
Alumni of St Edmund Hall, Oxford
Knights Bachelor
Knights Grand Cross of the Order of the British Empire
Fellows of the Academy of Medical Sciences (United Kingdom)
Fellows of King's College London
Honorary Fellows of the Royal Society
People educated at Westminster School, London